The Quapaw–Prospect Historic District is a predominantly residential historic district on the northwest side of Hot Springs, Arkansas.  It covers a roughly nine-block stretch of Quapaw and Prospect Streets, from their junction in the east to Grand Avenue in the west, including properties on streets running between the two.  The area was developed between about 1890 and 1950, and contains a cross-section of architectural styles popular in that period.  Although Colonial Revival and Craftsman style houses dominate the area, it has a particularly fine collection of Queen Anne Victorians as well.

The district was listed on the National Register of Historic Places in 2002.  Four properties that are included in the district were previously listed on the National Register: they are the Walter Beauchamp House, the Williams-Wootton House, the William H. Martin House, and the Charles N. Rix House.

See also

National Register of Historic Places listings in Garland County, Arkansas

References

Queen Anne architecture in Arkansas
Colonial Revival architecture in Arkansas
Buildings and structures completed in 1890
Hot Springs, Arkansas
Historic districts on the National Register of Historic Places in Arkansas
National Register of Historic Places in Hot Springs, Arkansas